KKBC-FM (95.3 FM, "Boomer Radio 95.3 & 105.9") is an American radio station licensed to serve Baker City, the county seat of Baker County, Oregon. The station is owned and operated by the Pacific Empire Radio Corporation. All five stations owned and operated by Pacific Empire Radio Corporation share a radio studio building in La Grande, Oregon, located at 2510 Cove Ave.

Programming
KKBC-FM broadcasts an oldies music format to the greater Baker area in simulcast with sister station KRJT (105.9 FM) in Elgin, Oregon. The joint broadcast is branded as  "Boomer Radio 95.3 & 105.9".

History
This station received its original construction permit from the Federal Communications Commission on February 26, 1979. The new station was assigned the KBKR-FM call sign by the FCC. After multiple extensions to complete construction, KBKR-FM received its license to cover from the FCC on March 30, 1981.

In March 1988, Oregon Trail Broadcasting, Inc., reached an agreement to sell this station to Grande Radio, Inc.  The deal was approved by the FCC on April 26, 1988, and the transaction was consummated on May 16, 1988. The new owners had the FCC change the call sign to KKBC-FM on May 23, 1988.

After two failed attempts to sell the station in 1998 and 2000, Grande Radio, Inc., reached an agreement in June 2004 to sell this station to Pacific Empire Radio Corporation (Mark Bolland, president/CEO) as part of a four-station deal valued at $1.9 million. The deal was approved by the FCC on July 19, 2004, and the transaction was consummated on September 3, 2004. At the time of the sale, KKBC-FM broadcast a classic hits music format.

References

External links
KKBC-FM official website

KBC-FM
Oldies radio stations in the United States
Radio stations established in 1981
La Grande, Oregon
Baker City, Oregon
1981 establishments in Oregon